Redemption is the second and final studio album by American rapper Huey, released on September 14, 2010. It was the last album released in his lifetime before he was murdered on June 25, 2020.

Background 
Huey originally recorded songs for an album entitled Strictly Business, but it ended up being released as a DVD. Redemption was supposed to be released in 2009. The album release got delayed and the album was released on September 14, 2010.

Art Direction by: Damgwoodwork.com

Track listing

References 

2010 albums
Huey (rapper) albums